Samuel Monroe Jr. (born November 28, 1973) is an American actor.

Career 
Monroe has acted in films including Menace II Society (1993), Tales from the Hood (1995), Set It Off (1996), and The Players Club (1998), and appeared in television series including Out All Night (1993) and NYPD Blue (1996).

Filmography

Film

Television

References

External links

Living people
American male film actors
American male television actors
1973 births
20th-century American male actors
21st-century American male actors